Marcel Maurice Carpentier (2 March 1895 – 14 September 1977) was a French Army general who served in World War I, World War II and First Indochina War.

Early life
Born on 2 March 1895 in Marseille, he was the eldest son in his family.  At 18 he entered the French military academy of Saint-Cyr, in August 1914 he was commissioned as a second lieutenant, less than a year later he was the youngest captain in the French Army at only 20, he started training to become a pilot. During the First World War he was wounded multiple times.

Military career
From 1940-1941 he served under Jean de Lattre de Tassigny as chief of staff of the commander in chief of North Africa at the headquarters of Vichy French forces in Tunisia. In 1942 Carpentier joined General Charles de Gaulle's Free French forces, becoming chief of staff of the French Expeditionary Corps in 1943. He continued in this post until 1944, when he became Commander of the 2nd 2nd Moroccan Infantry Division, with which he served until 1945.
After World War II he was in charge of France's 15 military regions and was appointed Commandant supérieur of Tunisian Troops in 1946. He was made Grand Officer of the French Legion of Honor in 1947.
In 1949 he was appointed commander-in-chief of French Union forces in Indochina, but in 1950 following the disastrous defeat in the Battle of Route Coloniale 4 he was replaced by de Lattre. Carpentier then returned to Europe to become chief of staff assigned to NATO in 1951, serving there until 1952. In 1956 he was appointed Inspector General of Infantry, eventually retiring as Commander in Chief of NATO for Central Europe.

References

Citations

Sources

Further reading
Obituary (in French)

1895 births
1977 deaths
Military personnel from Marseille
French generals
French military personnel of World War I
French military personnel of World War II
French military personnel of the First Indochina War
Grand Officiers of the Légion d'honneur